Umer Aslam Awan is a Pakistani politician who had been a member of the National Assembly of Pakistan from August 2018 till January 2023.

Political career
Malik Umer Aslam Awan succeeded maternal uncle Malik Naeem Khan and became MNA From Constituency NA69 in February 1997 but lost in series 2002, 2008, 2013 and bi-Election 2013 versus Sumaira Malik before winning again in 2018 elections. He was re-elected to the National Assembly of Pakistan from Constituency NA-93 (Khushab-I) as a candidate of Pakistan Tehreek-e-Insaf in 2018 Pakistani general election.

References

External Link

More Reading
 List of members of the 15th National Assembly of Pakistan

Living people
Pakistani MNAs 2018–2023
Year of birth missing (living people)